The pharmaceutical industry in India was valued at an estimated US$42 billion in 2021. India is the world's largest provider of generic medicines by volume, with a 20% share of total global pharmaceutical exports. It is also the largest vaccine supplier in the world by volume, accounting for more than 50% of all vaccines manufactured in the world. With industry standards compliant mega production capabilities and large number of skilled domestic workforce, Indian exports meet the standards and requirements of highly regulated markets of USA, UK, European Union and Canada. According to the Department of Pharmaceuticals, Ministry of Chemicals and Fertilizers, domestic pharmaceutical market turnover reached Rs 129,015 crore (US$18.12 billion) in 2018, growing 9.4 per cent year-on-year and exports revenue was US$17.28 billion in FY18 and US$19.14 billion in FY19.

As of 2021, most of pharmaceuticals made in India are low cost generic drug which comprise most of pharmaceutical export of India. Patented medicines are imported. APIs are imported from China (60% supplies by volume worth US$2.4 billion) and Germany (US$1.6 billion) as well as from US, Italy and Singapore. To foster an Atmanirbhar Bharat by enhancing the R&D, Make in India product development and high-value production capabilities, import substitution and domestic manufacture of active pharmaceutical ingredient (API) the government has introduced a US$2 billion incentive program which will run from 2021–22 to 2027–28. In 2019 the Department of Pharmaceuticals announced that as part of the Make in India initiative, drugs for local use and exports must have 75% and 10% local APIs respectively and a bill of material must be produced for verification. During 2018–2021, India ranked third globally in terms of dollar value of drugs and medicines exports.

Major pharmaceutical hubs in India are (clockwise from northwest): Vadodara, Ahmedabad, Ankleshwar, Vapi, Baddi, Sikkim, Kolkata, Visakhapatnam, Hyderabad, Bangalore, Chennai, Margao, Navi Mumbai, Mumbai, Pune and Aurangabad.

Overview

Summary

, over 20,000 registered drug-manufacturers in India sold $9 billion worth of formulations and bulk drugs. 85% of these formulations were sold in India while over 60% of the bulk drugs were exported, mostly to the United States and to Russia. Most of the players in the market are small-to-medium enterprises; 250 of the largest companies control 70% of the Indian market. Thanks to the 1970 Patent Act, multinationals represent only 35% of the market, down from 70% thirty years ago.

Most pharma companies operating in India, even the multinationals, employ Indians almost exclusively from the lowest ranks to high-level management. Homegrown pharmaceuticals, like many other businesses in India, are often a mix of public and private enterprise.

In terms of the global market, India currently holds an accountable share and is known as the pharmacy of the world
and as the biggest generic supplier. India produces more than 50% the world's vaccines and is the third largest pharmaceutical producer by volume. It supplies 40% of the US's demand for generic drugs. India gained its foothold on the global scene with its innovatively-engineered generic drugs and active pharmaceutical ingredients (API), The country accounts for around 30 per cent (by volume) and about 10 per cent (value) in the US$70–80 billion US generics market.  Growth in other fields notwithstanding, generics are still a large part of the picture. India is the largest provider of generic drugs globally. The Indian pharmaceutical-sector industry supplies over 50 per cent of global demand for various vaccines, 40 per cent of generic demand in the US and 25 per cent of all medicine in the UK. India is the largest contributor in UNESC with over 50-60% share.

Industry sector development

Government intervention 

The Indian government established the Department of Biotechnology in 1986 under the Ministry of Science and Technology. Since then, there have been a number of dispensations offered by both the central government and various states to encourage the growth of the industry. India's science minister launched a program that provides tax incentives and grants for biotech start-ups and firms seeking to expand and establishes the Biotechnology Parks Society of India to support ten biotech parks by 2010. Previously limited to rodents, animal testing was expanded to include large animals as part of the minister's initiative. States have started to vie with one another for biotech business, and they are offering such goodies as exemption from VAT and other fees, financial assistance with patents and subsidies on everything ranging from investment to land to utilities.

The Government started to encourage the growth of drug manufacturing by Indian companies in the early 1960s, and with the Patents Act in 1970. The government has addressed the problem of educated but unqualified candidates in its Draft National Biotech Development Strategy. This plan included a proposal to create a National Task Force that will work with the biotech industry to revise the curriculum for undergraduate and graduate study in life sciences and biotechnology. The government's strategy also stated intentions to increase the number of PhD Fellowships awarded by the Department of Biotechnology to 200 per year. These human resources will be further leveraged with a "Bio-Edu-Grid" that will knit together the resources of the academic and scientific industrial communities, much as they are in the US.

The biotechnology sector faces some major challenges in its quest for growth. Chief among them is a lack of funding, particularly for firms that are just starting out. The most likely sources of funds are government grants and venture capital, which is a relatively young industry in India. Government grants are difficult to secure, and due to the expensive and uncertain nature of biotech research, venture capitalists are reluctant to invest in firms that have not yet developed a commercially viable product.

Incentives for R&D, product development and high-value production

Government of India has launched a Production Linked Incentive (PLI) Scheme for Pharmaceuticals with provision for disbursal of US$2 billion or iNR 15,000 crore government incentives, which will run from 2020–21 to 2028–29, to reduce import dependence, benefit domestic manufacturers, boost product diversification and innovation for development of complex and high-tech products especially in in vitro diagnostic devices and emerging technologies especially in cell based or gene therapy, employment generation and production of wide range of lower cost affordable medicines for consumers with the aim to achieve incremental sales of US$4 billion or INR 294,000 crore and incremental exports of US$2.7 billion or INR 196,000 crore between 2022–23 to 2027–28.

Manufacture of API supplies in India 

To eliminate the dependence on China after the 2017 China–India border standoff to foster an Atmanirbhar Bharat, in July 2021 India's Council of Scientific and Industrial Research (CSIR) initiated a Make in India program in collaboration with the coal and petroleum industries of India to end-to-end manufacture 56 prioritised active pharmaceutical ingredient (API) for the essential medicines. In 2016–17, China was the largest supplier of API to India with 66% share by volume of API raw material supplies to India worth US$2.4 billion or INR 18,000 crore, followed by US$1.6 billion API imported from Germany, the US, Italy and Singapore are other major suppliers to India.

Foreign investment

Per India's Consolidated FDI Policy, 2020 (the “FDI Policy”), foreign direct investment (“FDI”) in the pharmaceutical sector in greenfield (new) projects is permitted up to 100% without the approval of the Department of Pharmaceuticals (the “DoP”). In brownfield (existing) projects, FDI exceeding 74% requires the investor to seek prior approval from the DoP in compliance with the prescribed conditions under the FDI Policy. 

Separately, FDI up to 100% is permitted for the manufacturing of medical devices for both greenfield and brownfield projects without the approval of the DoP.

An FDI approval from the DoP can be obtained within a period of ten to twelve weeks from the date of the application, depending on the completeness of the documentation submitted by the investor in support of the application, failing which, this timeline could vary.

Relation between pharma and biotech

India's biopharmaceutical industry clocked a 17% growth with revenues of Rs. 137 billion ($1.8 billion) in the 2009-10 financial year over the previous fiscal. Bio-pharma was the biggest contributor generating 60 percent of the industry's growth at Rs. 8,829 crore, followed by bio-services at Rs. 2,639 crore and bio-agri at Rs. 1,936 crore. Indian companies carved a niche in both the Indian and world markets with their expertise in reverse-engineering new processes for manufacturing drugs at low costs which became the advantage for industry.

Unlike in other countries, the difference between biotechnology and pharmaceuticals remains fairly defined in India, with biotech a much smaller part of the economy. India accounted for 2% of the $41 billion global biotech market and in 2003 was ranked 3rd in the Asia-Pacific region and 13th in the world in number of biotech. In 2004–5, the Indian biotech industry saw its revenues grow 37% to $1.1 billion. The Indian biotech market is dominated by biopharmaceuticals; 76% of 2004–5 revenues came from biopharmaceuticals, which saw 30% growth last year. Of the revenues from biopharmaceuticals, vaccines led the way, comprising 47% of sales. Biologics and large-molecule drugs tend to be more expensive than small-molecule drugs, and India hopes to sweep the market in bio-generics and contract manufacturing as drugs go off patent and Indian companies upgrade their manufacturing capabilities.

Most companies in the biotech sector are extremely small, with only two firms breaking 100 million dollars in revenues. At last count there were 265 firms registered in India, over 92% of which were incorporated in the last five years. The newness of the companies explains the industry's high consolidation in both physical and financial terms. Almost 30% of all biotech are in or around Bangalore, and the top ten companies capture 47% of the market. The top five companies were homegrown; Indian firms account for 72% of the bio-pharma sector and 52% of the industry as a whole.[4,46] The Association of Biotechnology-Led Enterprises (ABLE) is aiming to grow the industry to $5 billion in revenues generated by 1 million employees by 2009, and data from the Confederation of Indian Industry (CII) seem to suggest that it is possible.

Comparison with the United States

The Indian biotech sector parallels that of the US in many ways. Both are filled with small start-ups while the majority of the market is controlled by a few powerful companies. Both are dependent upon government grants and venture capitalists for funding because neither will be commercially viable for years. Pharmaceutical companies in both countries see growth potential in biotechnology and have either invested in existing start-ups or ventured into the field themselves.

Research and product development

Product development

Indian companies are also starting to adapt their product development processes to the new environment. For years, firms have made their ways into the global market by researching generic competitors to patented drugs and following up with litigation to challenge the patent. This approach remains untouched by the new patent regime and looks to increase in the future. However, those that can afford it have set their sights on an even higher goal: new molecule discovery. Although the initial investment is huge, companies are lured by the promise of hefty profit margins and thus a legitimate competitor in the global industry. Local firms have slowly been investing more money into their R&D programs or have formed alliances to tap into these opportunities.

Patents

In 1970, Indira Gandhi enacted legislation which barred medical products from being patented in the country. In 1994, 162 countries including India signed the Trade-Related Aspects of Intellectual Property Rights (TRIPS) agreement, which stipulated that patents had to be given to all inventions including medicines. India and other developing countries were provided an extra ten years to comply fully with the conditions mandated by TRIPS. India succeeded in including a crucial clause to the agreement in the form of the right to grant compulsory licenses (CLs) to others to manufacture drugs in cases where the government felt that the patent holder was not serving the public health interest. This right was used in 2012, when Natco was granted a CL to produce Nexavar, a cancer drug. In 2005, a provision was added to the new legislation as section 3(d) which stipulated that a medicine could not be patented if it did not result in "the enhancement of the known efficacy of that substance".

A significant change in intellectual property protection in India was 1 January 2005 enactment of an amendment to India's patent law that reinstated product patents for the first time since 1972. The legislation took effect on the deadline set by the WTO's Trade-Related Aspects of Intellectual Property Rights (TRIPS) agreement, which mandated patent protection on both products and processes for a period of 20 years. Under this new law, India will be forced to recognise not only new patents but also any patents filed after 1 January 1995.

In December 2005, the TRIPS pact was amended to incorporate specific safeguards to ensure that the public health concerns of affordability and accessibility for a large section of people in developing countries was not compromised. These amendments came into force only in January 2017, however, after two-thirds of the member countries ratified them.
In the domestic market, this new patent legislation has resulted in fairly clear segmentation. The multinationals narrowed their focus onto high-end patents who make up only 12% of the market, taking advantage of their newly bestowed patent protection. Meanwhile, Indian firms have chosen to take their existing product portfolios and target semi-urban and rural populations.

Types of companies 

The Indian pharmaceutical industry has 5 important segments; contract research and manufacturing services (CRAMS), active pharmaceutical ingredients (APIs), formulations, biologics and biosimilars, and vaccines. Various types of companies are within these segments.

Formulations 
India is considered globally as a high-quality generic medicines manufacturer. Most of India's largest pharmaceutical companies manufacture and export generic medicines, and are among the largest generic medicine companies globally. These companies include Sun Pharma, which is India's largest and the world's fourth largest specialty generics pharmaceutical company. Cipla, another large Indian pharmaceutical company, is noted for its pioneering role in manufacturing and exporting low-cost generic HIV/AIDS drugs to developing countries. As of 2021, Lupin is the third largest pharmaceutical company in the United States by prescriptions.

Active pharmaceutical ingredients (APIs) 
As of 2021, India's APIs market is worth $11.8 billion and is forecasted to grow at a compound annual growth rate of 12.24% until 2027. Several Indian companies manufacture APIs. One of India's largest pharmaceutical companies, Divi's Laboratories, is the world's largest manufacturer of more than 10 generic APIs. Laurus Labs supplies APIs to 9 out of the 10 largest generic pharmaceutical companies, and is a leading producer of APIs for antiretroviral, cardiovascular and oncology drugs. Piramal Pharma, a company that is part of the Piramal Group, develops and manufactures peptide APIs.

Contract research and manufacturing services (CRAMS) 
India has a rapidly growing CRAMS sector. Several Indian companies offer CRAMS services, which also includes contract development and manufacturing (CDMO) services. Most of India's CRAMS companies and contract manufacturing organizations (CMO) operate in the small molecules segment. Laurus labs offers biologics and fermentation CDMO services. Divi's Laboratories's CDMO client's include 6 of the top 10 largest multinational pharmaceutical companies. Syngene, a subsidiary of Biocon, offers CRAMS small molecules APIs and biologics. Piramal Pharma, through its investment in Yapan Bio offers CDMO services for biologics which include vaccines, gene therapies, and monoclonal antibodies. Suven Pharmaceuticals offers services across the entire CDMO value chain with both intermediates & API related CDMO services. The company is also among the top five CDMO companies in India who supply high quality intermediaries to innovator companies.

Biologics and biosimilars 
As of 2021, India controls only 8% of the world's biopharmaceutical market. India's domestic biosimilars market is projected to be valued at US$35 billion by 2030. Biocon is India's largest and fully-integrated biopharmaceutical company. In 2021, Biocon Biologics, a subsidiary of Biocon, received USFDA approval for Semglee, which is the first interchangeable biosimilar insulin glargine. Another subsidiary of Biocon, Biocon Sdn Bhd, built Asia's largest integrated insulin manufacturing and R&D facility in Malaysia, with a $300 million investment. Sun Pharma has stated that it intends to look at opportunities in third wave of bio-pharmaceuticals that are going off patent in 2026–27. Intas Pharmaceuticals is a large company in the global biosimilar monoclonal antibodies market.

Vaccines 
As of 2021, India is the world's largest manufacturing region for vaccines. In 2021, the World Health Organization (WHO) stated that India has more than a 40% of the global market share in vaccines. Serum Institute of India (SII) is the world's largest vaccine manufacturer by volume. SII manufactured Covishield, the Oxford-AstraZeneca COVID-19 vaccine, which is the most administered COVID-19 vaccine in India. SII and MassBiologics, part of the University of Massachusetts Chan Medical School, developed Rabishield, a first of its kind rabies human monoclonal antibody. Bharat Biotech, in collobartion with the Indian Council of Medical Research (ICMR) - National Institute of Virology (NIV), developed Covaxin, India's first COVID-19 vaccine. Bharat Biotech is also one of the first companies to develop vaccines for the Zika and Chikungunya viruses. Zydus Lifesciences developed the world's first human DNA COVID-19 vaccine and India's second indigenous COVID-19 Vaccine.

Largest companies

By market capitalization

Top 12 public pharmaceutical companies in India by market capitalization as of December 2022.

Top 6 private pharmaceutical companies in India by reported valuation in 2022.

By sales and marketing operations within India 

Multinational Pharmaceutical Companies ranked as per active presence of sales, marketing and business in India are as follows:

Pfizer
GlaxoSmithKline
Sanofi Aventis
Merck
Johnson and Johnson
Amgen
Novartis
Roche

Bristol-Myers Squibb
Eli Lilly and Company
Abbott
Takeda Pharmaceutical Company
Boehringer Ingelheim
Astellas

Exports 

Exports of pharmaceuticals products from India increased from US$6.23 billion in 2006–07 to US$8.7 billion in 2008-09 a combined annual growth rate of 21.25%.

India exported $11.7 billion worth of pharmaceuticals in 2014. Pharmaceutical export from India stood at US$17.27 billion in 2017–18, and is expected to grow by 30 per cent to reach US$20 billion by 2020.And India Share in This 40% The 10 countries below imported 56.5% of that total:

Criticism

Patents 
It has been pointed out that the pharma industry is not scrutinised enough when it comes to withdrawing patent challenges. For example, in the case of the patent application filed by Gilead Sciences for the Hepatitis C medicine sofosbuvir in 2014, Natco initially filed challenges to this application in Delhi. However, a month after signing a voluntary licensing agreement with Gilead, Natco withdrew the patent challenge. It has been argued that Mylan (an influential pharmaceutical company which was Natco's client) exerted pressure on the latter and 'brokered' a deal, though the term 'brokered' has been refuted by Mylan. Many activists argue that such agreements in effect deny patients in some countries the right to affordable drugs. It has also been pointed out that without the patent, voluntary licensing would imply charging rent on property not even owned by the company. The Competition Commission of India ought to carefully look at every withdrawal of patent challenges, as well as such private agreements, since these impact both public health and the competitive environment of the market.

Quality
Between 2015 and 2017, there were 31 FDA warning letters to Indian pharmaceutical companies citing serious Data Integrity issues, including data deletion, manipulation or fabrication of test results.

According to Outsourcing Pharma in 2012, 75% of counterfeit drugs supplied world over had some origins in India, followed by 7% from Egypt and 6% from China. The Central Drug Standards Control Organisation (CDSCO), the drug regulatory authority of India conducted a nationwide survey in 2009 and announced that of "24,000 samples [that] were collected from all over India and tested. It was found that only 11 samples or 0.046% were spurious." In 2017 a similar survey found 3.16% of the medicines sampled were substandard and 0.0245% were fake.  Those more commonly prescribed are probably more often faked.

See also
 Ayurveda
 Healthcare in India
 Medical tourism in India
 Opium and Alkaloid Works
 Contract Research Organization
 Genome Valley

References

 
Healthcare in India
Pharmacy in India
Industries in India